dirname is a standard computer program on Unix and Unix-like operating systems.  When dirname is given a pathname, it will delete any suffix beginning with the last slash ('/') character and return the result. dirname is described in the Single UNIX Specification and is primarily used in shell scripts.

History 
The version of dirname bundled in GNU coreutils was written by David MacKenzie and Jim Meyering. The command is available as a separate package for Microsoft Windows as part of the UnxUtils collection of native Win32 ports of common GNU Unix-like utilities. The  command has also been ported to the IBM i operating system.

Usage 
The Single UNIX Specification for dirname is:
 dirname string

string
A pathname

Examples 
dirname will retrieve the directory-path name from a pathname ignoring any trailing slashes
$ dirname /home/martin/docs/base.wiki
/home/martin/docs

$ dirname /home/martin/docs/.
/home/martin/docs

$ dirname /home/martin/docs/
/home/martin

$ dirname base.wiki
.

$ dirname /
/

Performance 
Since dirname accepts only one operand, its usage within the inner loop of shell scripts can be detrimental to performance. Consider
 while read file; do
     dirname "$file"
 done < some-input
The above excerpt would cause a separate process invocation for each line of input. For this reason, shell substitution is typically used instead 
 echo "${file%/*}";
or if relative pathnames need to be handled as well
 if [ -n "${file##*/*}" ]; then
     echo "."
 else
     echo "${file%/*}";
 fi
Note that these handle trailing slashes differently than dirname.

Misconceptions 
We might think that paths that end in a trailing slash are a directory. But actually, the trailing slash represents all files within the directory.

 /home/martin/docs/.

See also 
 List of Unix commands
 basename
 Path (computing)

References

External links 

 
 
 

Dirname
Unix SUS2008 utilities
IBM i Qshell commands